The Philadelphia, Wilmington and Baltimore Railroad (PW&B) was an American railroad that operated independently from 1836 to 1881. 

It was formed in 1836 by the merger of four state-chartered railroads in three Middle Atlantic states to create a single line between Philadelphia and Baltimore. In 1881, the PW&B was purchased by the Pennsylvania Railroad (PRR), which was at the time the nation's largest railroad. In 1902, the PRR merged it into its Philadelphia, Baltimore and Washington Railroad.

The right-of-way laid down by the PW&B line is still in use today as part of Amtrak's Northeast Corridor and the Maryland Department of Transportation's MARC commuter passenger system from Baltimore to Maryland's northeast corner. Freight is hauled on the route; formerly by the Conrail system and currently by Norfolk Southern.

History

Origins
On April 2, 1831, the General Assembly of Pennsylvania, seeking to improve transportation between Philadelphia and points south along the Atlantic coast and Eastern seaboard, chartered the Philadelphia and Delaware County Rail-Road Company. The legislature allotted $200,000 to build a rail line from America's largest city to the Delaware state line. In July 1835, surveyors began to look at possible routes, and in October, they reported that the best option, a 17-mile line, would cost $233,000 to build.

Meanwhile, further south, across the Mason–Dixon line, the Delaware and Maryland legislatures were doing their part to create a rail link to Wilmington and Baltimore. On January 18, 1832, the State of Delaware chartered the Wilmington and Susquehanna Rail Road Company (W&S, $400,000) to build from Wilmington to the Maryland state line. On March 5, the State of Maryland chartered the Baltimore and Port Deposite Rail Road Company (B&PD) (with $1,000,000) to build from Baltimore northeast to the western bank of the Susquehanna River. On March 12, the Delaware and Maryland Rail Road Company (D&M) was chartered for $3,000,000 to build from Port Deposit or any other point on the Susquehanna's eastern river bank north to the Delaware line.

In 1835, the W&S hired architect/surveyor William Strickland to make a preliminary survey to the southwest between Wilmington and North East, Maryland. That same year, the B&PD began operating trains between Baltimore harbor's "Basin" (today's Inner Harbor) waterfront and its Canton industrial, commercial and residential neighborhood to the southeast. But Matthew Newkirk, who had invested $50,000 in the B&PD including funds borrowed from the United States Bank, grew impatient. On Oct. 6, he wrote to the Company Board "demanding that Pres. Finley resign and be replaced by someone who will be more aggressive in collecting from delinquent subscribers and pushing project forward." As alternates, he suggests the noted lawyer, artist and civic activist, John H. B. Latrobe, brother of Chief Engineer Benjamin H. Latrobe, II (grandson of famous architect Benjamin Henry Latrobe), or Roswell L. Colt. Six days later, Colt became railroad line president, but his term lasted just five weeks; he was soon replaced by Lewis Brantz.

Operations 
The year 1836 saw several milestones. The P&DC opened its first segment of track; saw its allowable expenditures upped by the State to $400,000; and changed its name, on March 14, to The Philadelphia, Wilmington and Baltimore Railroad Company. On July 4, the PW&B began building its bridge over the Schuylkill River, the most significant obstacle on its part of the route. The bridge would cross at Gray's Ferry Bridge, south of the city. Meanwhile, on April 18, the D&M merged with the W&S, forming the Wilmington and Susquehanna Railroad Company.

Work proceeded in Delaware and Maryland as well. By July 1837, there was continuous track from Baltimore to Wilmington, broken only by the wide Susquehanna River, which trains crossed by steam-powered ferryboats at Havre de Grace to Perryville. That year, the railroad ordered seven 4-2-0 steam locomotives from Norris Locomotive Works; it ordered two more in or about 1840.

On January 15, 1838, the PW&B opened service from Wilmington to Gray's Ferry, then a few miles south of Philadelphia's city limits. Passengers debarking at Gray's Ferry were taken by omnibus into the city.

The disadvantages of tripartite ownership of the Philadelphia-Baltimore line having become obvious, the three remaining state-chartered railroads merged on February 12, 1838, to form the Philadelphia, Wilmington and Baltimore Railroad Company. (The new company's name differed from its predecessor's in that "The" at the beginning of the titled name was not part of its formal incorporated name.)

Among the passengers that year was Frederick Douglass, a slave who escaped his Baltimore owner by boarding a PB&W train, perhaps at Canton or somewhere east of where the President Street Station would be built in 1849, and riding it northeast to Philadelphia. To avoid detention, Douglass, a future world-famous abolitionist, statesman, Federal official, orator and publisher, borrowed a "seaman's protection", a document obtained by his future wife, a free black woman, which was normally carried by free black sailors, of which there were many in the merchant fleets and the navy. Later, the railroad would require black passengers to have "a responsible white person" sign a bond at the ticket office before allowing them to board.

In December, the PB&W completed its Schuylkill bridge at Gray's Ferry. Named the "Newkirk Viaduct" after PW&B president Matthew Newkirk, it allowed trains to run from downtown Philadelphia to downtown Baltimore, with only the Susquehanna River  steam railroad ferry interrupting the ride. (The railroad marked this achievement by erecting the Newkirk Viaduct Monument, a 15-foot marble obelisk designed by Thomas Ustick Walter, a future Architect of the Capitol.) That interruption was eventually bridged under pressure of the heavy traffic needs in 1864–5, the later days of the Civil War. After a disastrous storm damaged the new spans, reconstruction began anew and was completed by 1866.

The Baltimore & Ohio Railroad (B&O) began using the tracks that same year to offer service northeast of Baltimore to Philadelphia.

Expansion
In Baltimore, the PW&B's terminus and business office sat at the southwest corner of President and Fleet Streets, east of the Jones Falls, the eventual future site of the President Street Station. The line ran east along Fleet Street, turned southeast onto Boston Street and ran along the waterfront past Canton before turning northeast and leaving the city limits, heading east, then northeast towards the Susquehanna.

In Philadelphia, the line ended at Broad Street and Prime Avenue (today Washington Avenue), where it connected with the Southwark Rail-Road (built in 1835) to reach the Delaware River.

In 1839, the railroad's ticket agents advertised daily mail-and-passenger trains that left Baltimore's old original Pratt Street station (at South Charles Street) of the B&O (before 1857-65 construction of the now-famous Camden Street Station) at 9:30 a.m., stopped for lunch in Wilmington, and reached the Market Street depot in Philadelphia at 4 p.m.

In 1842, Newkirk resigned as PW&B president. He was replaced by Matthew Brooke Buckley (1794-1856), who had become a PW&B board member on Jan. 10, 1842, and one week later had taken over leadership of one of the railroad's three executive committees, the Northern one. As president, Buckley helped create the first telegraph line, (the previous invention of Samuel F. B. Morse laid over the B&O line to Washington in 1844),  from Philadelphia to Baltimore (and hence from points north and south) by agreeing to allow the builder to use the PW&B  right-of-way in exchange for the use of the communications equipment.

On Jan. 12, 1846, Buckley was replaced by Edward C. Dale, a grandson of Richard Dale, one of the U.S. Navy's first commodores.

Between 1846 and 1849, the railroad ordered five more locomotives, likely 4-4-0s, from the Norris Works.

In February 1850, the PW&B improved its Baltimore terminus by completing erection of a new station, with a 208-foot (63 m) barrel-vaulted train shed. Service onward to Washington, D.C., was facilitated by drawing the coaches by horse down Pratt Street to the B&O terminal, first at East Pratt and South Charles Streets, later after 1857, to the new Camden Street Station. (In 1861, one week after the American Civil War began with the Confederate firings on Fort Sumter, in Charleston harbor, in South Carolina, an angry mob of Southern sympathizers attacked a trainload of future Union Army soldiers of the 6th Massachusetts volunteer state militia, joined in Philadelphia by the "Washington Brigade" of Pennsylvania state militia, heading to Washington to protect the Capital and respond to President Lincoln's call for 75,000 troops and declaring a state of rebellion. Because locomotives were not allowed to transfer through the city possibly for fire safety reasons during their transfer: the "First Bloodshed" of this famous "Pratt Street Riot" set the nation irrevocably on the path to war.) Unwieldy as it was, the arrangement allowed the railroads to temporarily compete with the Philadelphia and Columbia Railroad (renamed Pennsylvania Railroad after 1857) on routes going west from Philadelphia. By 1853, the Camden and Amboy Railroad and New Jersey Railroad were also part of this agreement, providing through service from New York City to the West.

From 1863 to 1865, the railroad ordered ten 4-4-0 locomotives from the Norris Works.

The PB&W also extended its reach into Delaware – on March 15, 1839, it bought the New Castle and Frenchtown Turnpike and Rail Road running from New Castle, Delaware, to Frenchtown, Maryland – but it took 13 years to connect the line to the rest of the PW&B. The "New Castle and Wilmington Railroad" was chartered to do so, and opened in 1852. The line also provided a connection with the Delaware Railroad, which the PW&B took over and began to operate on January 1, 1857. In 1859, the NC&F was abandoned west of Porter, the junction with the Delaware Railroad. By 1866, these moves and others allowed the PW&B to dominate the Delmarva Peninsula rail market.

In November 1866, the Susquehanna River was bridged at last by the PW&B Bridge, a 3,269-foot (996 m) wooden truss, finally creating a continuous rail connection between Philadelphia and Baltimore.

To avoid swampy areas and serve more populated ones, the PW&B built the Darby Improvement, which diverged from its existing main line just south of the Grays Ferry Bridge, passed through Darby, and rejoined it at Eddystone, just upriver from Chester. The new inland track opened on November 18, 1872. The PW&B dispensed with the 9.9-mile old alignment less than a year later, leasing it on July 1, 1873, to the Philadelphia and Reading Railway for 999 years with the stipulation that it would be used solely for freight. (The Reading dubbed the line, along with some connecting track, its Philadelphia and Chester Branch; southbound trains reached it via the Junction Railroad (jointly controlled by PW&B, Reading, and PRR) and continued on to the connecting Chester and Delaware River Railroad.)

The PW&B, which had competed so fiercely with the Pennsylvania, began to see their interests align. In 1873, the PRR opened the Baltimore and Potomac Rail Road (founded 1853, organized 1858), from Baltimore to Washington. The PW&B agreed to allow the PRR to use its track between Philadelphia and Baltimore, helping the PRR offer a shorter and more direct trip to Washington.

On May 15, 1877, the PW&B formally absorbed the New Castle and Frenchtown and New Castle and Wilmington railroads, forming a branch line from Wilmington to Rodney. On May 21, 1877, it then absorbed the Southwark railroad, extending its main line to the Delaware River waterfront.

Fight for control
In 1880, a conflict began between the PRR and the B&O, both of which operated over the PW&B. The B&O was working to reduce its reliance on PRR tracks; it had recently arranged to switch its Philadelphia-New York trains to the new Reading-controlled "Bound Brook Route," which had recently broken the PRR's monopoly on travel to New York via New Jersey. At the time, northbound B&O trains left the PW&B at Gray's Ferry Bridge in southwest Philadelphia and traveled over the Junction Railroad to Belmont, where they reached Reading rails and continued north. However, a mile of the Junction Railroad's track through Philadelphia was owned and used by the PRR, which showed great ingenuity in arranging delays to B&O trains.

The irate John W. Garrett (1820–84), Civil War-era President of the Baltimore & Ohio, decided to counter-attack by quietly buying out the PW&B, which would have cut off the Pennsylvania Railroad from its Baltimore & Potomac subsidiary. However, his agent encountered unexpected difficulties in buying up a majority of the stock at the price specified. Meanwhile, Garrett's maneuver became known to the PRR, which quickly bought out a majority of the stock at a somewhat higher price, preemptively taking control of the PW&B. Garrett and the Baltimore and Ohio were forced later to construct an independent separate northeast line to Philadelphia, the Baltimore and Philadelphia Railroad, while paying the PRR substantial fees to continue service further north to New York City over their lines. The new line opened in 1886; the Reading also used it to avoid the Junction Railroad.

PRR subsidiaries
A number of branches were built, bought and sold from 1881 to 1891, as described below. In 1895, the main line was realigned and straightened at Naaman's Creek in Delaware. The old line would become sidings for Claymont Steel.

The PRR's Baltimore and Potomac Rail Road was formally leased to the PW&B on November 1, 1891.

The Elkton and Middletown Railroad, opened in 1895, was planned as a cutoff between the main line at Elkton, Maryland, and the Delaware Railroad at Middletown, Delaware. However, only a short piece of track, serving industries in Elkton, was ever constructed. It was consolidated into the Philadelphia, Baltimore and Washington Railroad on September 15, 1916.
An 1895 historian of the PRR had this to say about the significance of the PW&B, which it had acquired and gained control of fourteen years before:An important constituent of a great North and South line of transportation, it challenges ocean competition and carries on its rails not only statesmen and tourists but a valuable interchange of products between different lines of latitude. As a military highway, it is of the greatest strategic importance to the national, industrial, and commercial capitals – Washington, Philadelphia and New York. It presents some of the very best transportation facilities to the commerce of the cities after which it is named and could not be obliterated from the railroad map of the United States without materially disturbing its harmony.

Merger 
The PW&B merged with the Baltimore and Potomac on November 1, 1902, to form the Philadelphia, Baltimore and Washington Railroad.

Branches
Southwark
60th Street/Chester: Built in 1918, it stretched  from South 58th Street in Philadelphia, Pennsylvania, to Hog Island, Pennsylvania. 
South Chester
Edgemoor
Augustine Mill: Also called the Brandywine Branch, it was built in 1882 from Landlith north along the Brandywine Creek to reach the Augustine Mills of the Jessup & Moore Paper Company, and was later extended further north to serve the Kentmere and Rockford Mills of Joseph Bancroft & Sons.
Shellpot: Also called the Shellpot Cutoff, it was built in 1888 from Edgemoor (near the crossing of the Shellpot Creek) around the south side of Wilmington to  a point on the main line between Wilmington and Newport. It served as a freight bypass, to avoid what was then street running on the main line through Wilmington.
Delaware Branch: Formed from the old New Castle & Frenchtown and New Castle & Wilmington trackage between Wilmington and Rodney, via New Castle. It was sold to the Delaware Railroad in 1891.
New Castle Cut-off: Built in 1888 from a point on the Shellpot Branch just across the Christina River from Cherry Island, south to New Castle and a connection with the Delaware Branch. It was sold with the Delaware Branch to the Delaware Railroad in 1891.
Delaware City: Sold by the Newark and Delaware City Railroad to the PW&B in 1881. It ran south and east from the main line at Newark to Delaware City.
Port Deposit: Built in 1866 up the Susquehanna River from Perryville to the river town of Port Deposit. In 1893, it was sold to the Columbia and Port Deposit Railway, also PRR-controlled, which connected with it at Port Deposit.
 Baltimore Union

See also
Newkirk Viaduct Monument
Philadelphia, Wilmington and Baltimore Railroad Freight Shed
History of rail transport in Philadelphia
Baltimore and Philadelphia Railroad

References

External links

Christopher Baer's PRR Chronology, hosted by The Pennsylvania Railroad Technical & Historical Society
Railroad History Database
PRR Corporate History
Data visualization of 1857 passenger traffic from various PW&B stations
1949 map of PB&W lines in 1881
William Strickland's 1835 report on the feasibility of the Wilmington & Susquehanna route
Photo of late-1800s PW&B baggage tag

Annual reports
First Annual Report of the Philadelphia, Wilmington and Baltimore Rail Road Company ...: 1838-1840:Google, Hathitrust
 Organization of the United Companies Under the Name of Philadelphia, Wilmington and Baltimore Rail Road Company with Articles of Union
 The Sixth Annual Report of the Philadelphia, Wilmington & Baltimore Railroad Company (1844)
35th through 48th Annual Report of the President and Directors of the Philadelphia, Wilmington and Baltimore Rail Road Company (1872–85)
Fifty-Sixth Annual Report Of The Philadelphia Wilmington And Baltimore Railroad Company (1893)

Defunct Delaware railroads
Defunct Maryland railroads
Defunct Pennsylvania railroads
Companies affiliated with the Philadelphia, Baltimore and Washington Railroad
Predecessors of the Pennsylvania Railroad
Standard gauge railways in the United States
Railway companies established in 1836
Railway companies disestablished in 1916
Defunct Virginia railroads
Defunct Washington, D.C., railroads
1836 establishments in the United States
American companies established in 1836
American companies disestablished in 1916
Companies based in Philadelphia